Orient Point is a small village in the Shoalhaven area of New South Wales, Australia. It is located on the southern side of the mouth of the Crookhaven River and adjoins the village of Culburra Beach to the south. The Jerrinja Aboriginal Mission is located near the village.

History

Traditionally and historically the land at Orient Point is part of the country belonging to the Jerrinja Aboriginal people.

A shepherd named Patrick Caffey, who worked for Alexander Berry, the man who gave his name to the nearby town of Berry, was probably the first to establish a farm at Orient Point.

Apart from a few farmers, the Jerrinja people remained the majority of the population living at Orient Point during the 19th and early 20th century.

In 1900 an Aboriginal Mission was established called Roseby Park which after 1966 was renamed Jerrinja. In 1978 the titles deeds to the Mission land were given back to the Jerrinja community. The Jerrinja people at Orient Point were all moved to the Mission in the early 20th century.

During the 1950s and 1960s more than 300 houses were built at Orient Point which up until that point had remained largely rural.

References

Towns in New South Wales
Towns in the South Coast (New South Wales)
City of Shoalhaven